David Larrubia Romano (born 20 April 2002) is a Spanish footballer who plays as an attacking midfielder for Mérida AD on loan from Málaga CF.

Club career
Born in Málaga, Andalusia, Larrubia joined Málaga CF's youth setup in 2012, from Roma Luz CF. He made his senior debut with the reserves on 8 September 2019, playing the last 26 minutes of a 1–1 Tercera División away draw against CP Almería.

Larrubia made his first team debut on 13 September 2020, coming on as a late substitute for Cristian Rodríguez in a 0–2 loss at CD Tenerife in the Segunda División championship. On 9 November, he renewed his contract until 2023.

On 1 August 2022, Larrubia extended his contract for a further year, and was loaned to Primera Federación side Mérida AD for the season, with an option to buy.

References

External links
Málaga profile 

2002 births
Living people
Footballers from Málaga
Spanish footballers
Footballers from Andalusia
Association football midfielders
Segunda División players
Tercera División players
Atlético Malagueño players
Málaga CF players
Mérida AD players
Spain youth international footballers